The Kingdom of Bonny, otherwise known as Grand Bonny, is a traditional state based on the town of Bonny in Rivers State, Nigeria. In the pre-colonial period, it was an important slave trading port, later trading palm oil products. 
During the 19th century the British became increasingly involved in the internal affairs of the kingdom, in 1886 assuming control under a protectorate treaty. Today the King of Bonny has a largely ceremonial role.

Introduction

Bonny Kingdom was founded by Ndoli, a man from the Isedani lineage of Kolokuma in the Ebeni-toru region  (in the present day Kolokuma/Opokuma Local Government Area of Bayelsa State). The Kingdom was founded before or about 1000 AD. Its modern name, "Bonny", is a corruption of the original Ubani. An alternative name, Okoloama (lit. "The Island of Curlews"), is also widely used.

The hereditary king, the Amanyanabo, originated from the bloodline of the earliest kings of Bonny. The subsequent monarchs of the kingdom have all derived authority from the first settlers of the kingdom, namely Ndoli, Opu Amaka Uba, Alagbariya, and Asimini. All four were in turn blood relatives.

The original monarch, along with the rest of the founding generation of the kingdom, established its civilization and commonwealth during what is known as the classical era. After Ndoli died, his blood descendants ruled the kingdom as its kings until the reign of King Awusa (alias Halliday) at the start of the modern period. King Awusa Halliday was the twelfth monarch to rule the kingdom of Grand Bonny. After his reign, King Perekule I emerged as his successor.

The House system

King Awusa Halliday was succeeded in the kingship by King Perekule, who was crowned by Chief Adapa Alagbariya. This was long before King Perekule created a new class of chiefs in the kingdom, one that began with Chief Allison Nwaoju (of the Allison Nwaoju Major House) in about the second half of the 18th century. The chieftaincy titles created by King Perekule, which were based on the lineage/house/family system that was itself first established by the founding generation of the ancient kingdom, are distinct from the hereditary traditional rulership chieftaincies of the "Duawaris" (or original royal houses) of Grand Bonny.

According to Ibani traditions, the kingship of Perekule I and his descendants is not supposed to interfere with the inalienable internal autonomy of these Duawaris. Their traditional rulers – who are not kings – are styled as "Aseme-Alapu" (lit. high chiefs of royal blood) and "Amadapu" (lit. district heads). As a result of this, the traditional ranks and titles of the rulers of the Duawaris are different from those that are within the personal gift of the monarch, the Amanyanabo. Rather than being derived from the king creating his own chiefs (a tradition which, as we have seen, is of a relatively recent origin), they are instead derived from the high chiefs and district heads' direct descent from the founding fathers of the kingdom.

History

Trade
Bonny became important in the 15th century with the arrival of the Portuguese and the growth of the Atlantic slave trade. At its height of power, Bonny was one of the main entrepôts on the Slave Coast. Later the Dutch and then the British took control of the slave trade in the region, with the British renaming the port "Bonny".
When the British passed an act to abolish the slave trade in 1807, the port turned to the export of palm oil products, ivory and Guinea pepper.

Growing British influence

William Dappa Pepple I ascended the throne in 1830.
Over time, he became ineffective, essentially related to a stroke in 1852. Others became opportunistic and stirred up opposition to his rule.
In 1854 the British deported the king.
King Dapu Fubara II Pepple ("Dappo") was appointed in his place, but died on 13 Aug 1855. The acting British Consul in the Bight of Biafra, J.W.B. Lynslager, signed a document on 11 September 1855 appointing the chiefs Anne Pepple, Ada Allison, Captain Hart and Manilla Pepple as a regency, required to consult with Banigo and Oko Jumbo, "two gentlemen of the river".

Bonny civil war
Oko Jumbo, who became leader of the Fubara Manilla Pepple house and effective ruler of the kingdom, became engaged in a struggle with the Anne Pepple house, which was led by a Igbo chief named Jubo Jubogha, known as Ja-Ja to the British.

In an attempt to stabilize the situation, the British restored King William Dappa Pepple I in 1861, and for the next five years until his death on 30 September 1866 the kingdom was relatively peaceful.

King William Dappa was succeeded by his son George Oruigbiji Pepple (born 1849), who had been educated in England.
George Pepple was a Christian, and on 21 April 1867, supported by Oko Jumbo and other chiefs, he declared the iguana was no longer the sacred deity of the kingdom.
The tension between the Manilla Pepple and Anne Pepple houses was revived at this time. In 1869 a major battle between the two factions led to Ja-Ja founding a new state at Opobo, further inland, taking some of the palm oil trade away from Bonny.

Other wars
Bonny had previously been on reasonably good terms with the Kalabari Kingdom, a trading state on the New Calabar and Imo rivers. With the loss of trade to Opobo, Bonny began pushing up rivers traditionally controlled by Kalabari, causing a series of armed clashes. Bonny was at times assisted by the Nembe Kingdom to the west and Okrika further inland, while Opobo allied with Kalabari.
In 1873, and again in 1882 the British consul had to intervene and force the feuding parties to agree to treaties.

Protectorate and later history

The unstable balance of power within Bonny deteriorated. On 14 December 1883 King George was deposed. 

The next year Oko Jumbo fell out with the other chiefs in Bonny. There were rumors that he wanted to place one of his sons on the throne, although a planned coup attempt in January 1885 came to nothing. Another son, Herbert Jumbo, who had been educated in England, quarreled with his father and placed himself under the protection of the British consul.

In February 1886 a protectorate treaty was concluded between Bonny and Britain. A ruling council was established, and King George Pepple was restored to his throne. Oko Jumbo was publicly degraded, his bans on Christianity were repealed and afterwards he was a spent force in Bonny politics.

King George died in October 1888, and was succeeded by a series of regents, kings and at one time a Chiefs Council before Edward Asimini William Dappa Pepple III (Perekule XI) took the throne in 1996.

Rulers

Independent state during the early modern era

The following were the independent rulers of Bonny.

Protectorate and Nigerian Federation

These are the rulers that reigned after the Kingdom of Bonny became part of the British protectorate, as well as the ones that have reigned in the independent Federation of Nigeria:

References

History of Nigeria
Nigerian traditional states